Espinal is a municipality that is located in the central area of the state of Veracruz in the Totonaca Region. It is located at coordinates 20° 16' north latitude and 97° 24' west longitude, and has a height of 100 m.

The municipality is made up 82 localities where 24,823 people live.

References

Municipalities of Veracruz